The Tunnel Gang is a 2016 Spanish comedy film directed by Pepón Montero. The ensemble cast features Arturo Valls, Raúl Cimas, Natalia de Molina and Neus Asensi, among others.

Plot 
The plot tracks the interactions of a group of survivors from a disaster (they were trapped in a tunnel for 15 days) after their rescue.

Cast

Production 
The film was produced by Pólvora Films, Estela Films, Lanube Películas and Toniconinormal AIE, and it had the participation of Atresmedia, Movistar+ and Canal Sur Radio y Televisión. Filming began on 27 September 2015 and lasted for 7 weeks. Shooting locations included Madrid and Toledo.  was responsible for the music.

Release 
The film had its world premiere at the 18th  (Abycine) on 22 October 2016. Distributed by eOne Films Spain, the film was theatrically released in Spain on 20 January 2017.

Reception 
Jordi Costa of Fotogramas rated The Tunnel Gang 4 out of 5 stars, assessing it to be reminiscent of Italian post-war comedies, and considering that, rather than featuring deliberate comical one-liners, the comedy value of the whole is relentless by relying on an "absolute confidence in a perfect and dedicated cast and a great ability to know in what voice and tone the everyday and even the trivial will turn out to be hilarious".

Andrea G. Bermejo of Cinemanía rated the film 4 out of 5 stars, describing the film as being, in addition to "unclassifiable", "wilfully comic".

Beatriz Martínez of El Periódico de Catalunya scored 3 out of 5 stars, underscoring the film to be "a little eccentricity, a rara avis out of the menu", surprising due to the "strangeness of its proposal".

Raquel Hernández Luján of HobbyConsolas scored 55 out of 100 points ("average"), deeming The Tunnel Gang to be a "strange comedy tinged with drama", highlighting the narration of what happened in the tunnel as the best thing about the film, while negatively assessing the excessive number of characters, the "irregular" pace and "certain lack of wit in the dialogues".

Accolades 

|-
| align = "center" | 2018 || 5th Feroz Awards || colspan = "2" | Special Award ||  || align = "center" | 
|}

See also 
 List of Spanish films of 2017

References 

2010s Spanish-language films
Spanish comedy films
2016 comedy films
Films shot in the province of Toledo
Films shot in Madrid
2010s Spanish films